André Sehmisch (born 27 September 1964 in Steinheidel-Erlabrunn) is a former German biathlete.

Career
In 1987 and 1989 he became world champion with the East German relay team. In 1986 he won the overall World Cup. After the German reunification, Sehmisch was passed over for many younger racers. In the 1992–93 season he finished second in the overall European Cup. Sehmisch retired after that season. 
He later opened a skiing school. He began his career at the SG Dynamo Schwarzenberg / Sportvereinigung (SV) Dynamo.

Biathlon results
All results are sourced from the International Biathlon Union.

Olympic Games

World Championships
9 medals (2 gold, 3 silver, 4 bronze)

*During Olympic seasons competitions are only held for those events not included in the Olympic program.
**Team was added as an event in 1989.

Individual victories
2 victories (1 In, 1 Sp)

*Results are from UIPMB and IBU races which include the Biathlon World Cup, Biathlon World Championships and the Winter Olympic Games.

References

External links
 
Homepage

1964 births
Living people
German male biathletes
Biathletes at the 1988 Winter Olympics
Olympic biathletes of East Germany
Biathlon World Championships medalists
People from Erzgebirgskreis
Sportspeople from Saxony